The Saryara's are a Hindu caste found in the Jammu and Kashmir. According to the 2001 Census of India, their population was 13,327. The Saryara's observe their annual congregation on 15 Āṣāḍha (as per Hindu calendar) in Bahu Fort at community's Devsathan, Mahatma Atma Ram Samadhi in Bahu Fort Jammu.

Origin 

The Saryara caste mainly found in the Indian administered area of Jammu and Kashmir.  They were traditionally follows Hindu ritual.   They are also found in other northern states of India and in Pakistan. In Pakistan Saryara's follows Muslim religion. According to the 2001 Census of India, in Jammu and Kashmir population of Saryara community was 13,327 with almost half of them are living in Bahu Fort, an old town situated along the banks of Jammu Tawi river. [2] The Saryara community observes their annual congregation on 15 Āṣāḍha (as per Hindu calendar) at community's Devsathan, Mahatma Atma Ram Samadhi situated in Bahu Fort, Jammu.
Saryara community found its linkage with Raja Bahu Lochan, ruler of the Jammu dynasty of Suryavanshi kings. Bahu was eldest among 18 sons of powerful Agnigarbha II. Raja Bahu is credited with establishing the Jammu city and building beautiful fort with temple inside at Bank of Tawi River. 
Later, Bahu's brother Jambu Lochan founded Jammu city on another bank of river and left Bahu Fort.
However, the present fort was rebuilt, probably at the same location as the ancient fort, by Autar Dev, the grandson of King Kapoor Dev in 1585. Over the years the fort underwent demolitions and reconstructions from time to time, until during Sikh Empire the then new Governor/Raja of Jammu Maharaja Gulab Singh reconstructed the present fort in the 19th century, which was further refurbished during the rule of Maharaja Ranbir Singh.

Present circumstances 
The Saryara are strictly endogamous, and like other Jammu Hindus practice clan exogamy. Their main clans include the Sagotra, Dalotra, Pajgotra, Dadwal, Basotra, And, Padwal, Shabotra, Gotra,Patru, Nagotra, Sawalia etc.
The Saryara live in multi-caste villages, occupying their own distinct quarters. Each of their settlement contains a caste council which resolves intra community disputes and enforces community norms. The Saryara also have a statewide caste association based in the Bahu Fort locality. As community mainly prefers to live together and was famous for their unity during the bad times of each other.
The Saryara were traditionally a community of honest and workaholic people and mainly involves in labour works. But with the growth of the world, this community also left their mark at modern world. Now presence of Saryara is almost all over the country and giving their services in almost every field.

References 

Dalit communities
Scheduled Castes of Jammu and Kashmir
Hindu communities